Melopyrrha is a genus of passerine birds in the tanager family Thraupidae. It is made up of four extant species endemic to the Greater Antilles, along with 1 possibly extinct species from the island of Saint Kitts in the Lesser Antilles.

Taxonomy
The genus Melopyrrha was introduced in 1853 by the French naturalist Charles Lucien Bonaparte. The type species was later specified  by George Robert Gray as the Cuban bullfinch. The name combines the Ancient Greek melas meaning "black" with the genus Pyrrhula introduced by Mathurin Jacques Brisson for the bullfinches. This genus was formerly monospecific containing only the Cuban bullfinch. A molecular phylogenetic study published in 2014 found that the genus Loxigilla was polyphyletic and that the Greater Antillean bullfinch, Puerto Rican bullfinch and Cuban bullfinch formed a clade. The three species were therefore placed together in Melopyrrha. In 2021, the possibly extinct St. Kitts bullfinch (M. grandis) was split from M. portoricensis as a distinct species.

Although these species were traditionally placed with the buntings and New World sparrows in the family Emberizidae, molecular genetic studies have shown that they are members of the tanager family Thraupidae and belong to the subfamily Coerebinae that also contains Darwin's finches.

Species
The four species in the genus are:

References 

 
Bird genera
Higher-level bird taxa restricted to the West Indies
Taxa named by Charles Lucien Bonaparte
Taxonomy articles created by Polbot